Quercus tonduzii is a species of oak. It is endemic to Costa Rica. It is placed in section Lobatae.

References

tonduzii
Endemic flora of Costa Rica
Trees of Costa Rica
Data deficient plants
Taxonomy articles created by Polbot
Taxobox binomials not recognized by IUCN